Guy I (died 1095) was the second lord of Bray and the second lord of Montlhéry (Latin: Monte Leterico).  He was probably the son of Thibaud of Montmorency, but some sources say that his father was named Milo. Thibaud may instead have been his grandfather.

He married Hodierna of Gometz, sister of William, lord of Gometz. They had seven children:
Milo I the Great, (also called Milon I)  lord of Montlhéry, married Lithuaise, Vicomtesse of Troyes
Melisende of Montlhéry (d. 1097), married Hugh I, Count of Rethel. Mother of Baldwin II of Jerusalem.
Elizabeth (Isabel) of Montlhéry, married Joscelin, lord of Courtenay. Mother of Joscelin I, Count of Edessa
Guy II the Red (d. 1108), lord of Rochefort
Beatrice of Rochefort (1069–1117), married Anseau of Garlande 
Hodierna of Montlhéry, married Walter of Saint-Valery
Alice of Montlhéry (also called Adele or Alix) (1040–1097), married Hugh I, lord of Le Puiset (1035–1094). Their son was Hugh I of Jaffa and daughter was Humberge of Le Puiset who travelled on the First Crusade with her husband Walo II of Chaumont-en-Vexin.  Humberge's cousin (name unknown) was married to Ralph the Red of Pont-Echanfrey who also travelled with her husband on crusade.

Guy died in 1095, the same year Pope Urban II launched the First Crusade. Many of his descendants had illustrious careers in the Holy Land, through the Montlhéry, Courtenay, and Le Puiset branches of his family.

See also
Houses of Montlhéry and Le Puiset

References

Sources 

1095 deaths
Year of birth unknown
Île-de-France
First Crusade
1090s in France